Pentti Kotvio (28 May 1921 – 9 December 2001) was a Finnish weightlifter. He competed in the men's bantamweight event at the 1948 Summer Olympics.

References

1921 births
2001 deaths
Finnish male weightlifters
Olympic weightlifters of Finland
Weightlifters at the 1948 Summer Olympics
Sportspeople from Tampere